Syaiful Iskandar is a Singaporean footballer who used to play for Warriors & Tampines Rovers as a defender. He can operate either as a left back or left wing-back.

S.League career
Syaiful Iskandar started off his career as a youth player in Woodlands Wellington since 1997 and was promoted to the Rams' senior squad in 2004 before he joined SAFFC in the 2010 S.League season.

After spending two seasons with the Warriors, he moved to Tampines Rovers in 2012, earning himself a winner's medal with Tampines as the Stags retained their 2nd consecutive S.League title at the end of the 2012 S.League season. He was also a Singapore Cup runner-up with Tampines when they lost 2–1 to SAFFC in the 2012 Singapore Cup final.

Club career statistics

Syaiful Iskandar's Profile

All numbers encased in brackets signify substitute appearances.
*Tampines Rovers appeared in the AFC Cup in 2012.

References

Singaporean footballers
Living people
1985 births
Woodlands Wellington FC players
Warriors FC players
Tampines Rovers FC players
Singapore Premier League players
Association football defenders